Acinetobacter seifertii is  bacterium from the genus Acinetobacter which has been isolated from human clinical specimens.

References

External links
Type strain of Acinetobacter seifertii at BacDive -  the Bacterial Diversity Metadatabase

Moraxellaceae
Bacteria described in 2015